Khevisberi (lit. "an elder of the gorge") secular and ecclesiastical ruler of a Khevi in the Eastern Georgian highlands: He is an elderly man who follows a monk-like life. Khevisberi performs different rituals and ceremonies and supervises brewing of the sacred beer.

Historically, Georgian patriarchal highlander communities enjoyed a degree of autonomy and they were not integrating into the feudal system. they were rather electing their own council of elders and leaders, known as Khevisberi who functioned as a judge, priest and military leader and submitted themselves only to the Georgian monarchs.

In popular culture 
 Alexander Kazbegi's novel "Khevisberi Gocha";
 the 1964 film "Khevisberi Gocha (1964)" based on Alexander Kazbegi's novel.

References

Sources 
 R. Metreveli, Georgian Soviet Encyclopedia, XI, p. 451, Tbilisi, 1986

Social classes
Religious leaders from Georgia (country)
Titles